Damascus is a census-designated place and an unincorporated area in Montgomery County, Maryland, United States. In the early 20th century, there existed an incorporated municipality lasting a quarter century. It had a population of 17,224 as of the 2020 census. Damascus is located at the intersection of two major roads in upper Montgomery County: Ridge Road (currently Rt. 27) and Damascus Road (currently Rt. 108).

Etymology
The name was first used in an official document in 1816, when the United States Congress approved a postal route through the area, operated by Edward Hughes.

History 
The area currently known as Damascus was granted by the new U.S. state of Maryland to Nathaniel Pigman in 1783. On February 14, 1819, War of 1812 veteran Edward Hughes bought a  section of the grant and began subdividing lots for sale. James Madison, the fourth U.S. president, appointed Hughes postmaster of the developing community of Damascus in 1816. Hughes received permission from Congress for a postal route through the town. Hughes called his town "The Pleasant Plains of Damascus" after Damascus, Syria. A newspaper in Frederick wrote of Hughes's growing town: "There is at this place an extensive opening for mechanics of all the different kinds, and it bids fair to improve very fast; ... There is at present two blacksmith shops, a saddler's shop and a store in the place -- a tailor, a wheel wright, and a shoemaker are much wanted, and would meet with great encouragement." This was the Damascus of 1816. The new township drew settlers from Anne Arundel County as well as from Montgomery County. On September 12, 1862, U.S. Army troops marched through the "village" of Damascus via what is now Route 27 on their way to the town of Sharpsburg, where they engaged Confederate troops commanded by General Robert E. Lee at the Battle of Antietam.

The town was incorporated from 1890 to 1914, when the townspeople requested the incorporation be withdrawn so that Old Quaker Road, used since Revolutionary times and before, could be paved into a state highway. The town remains a commercial center for rural communities like Clagettsville, Browningsville, Cedar Grove, Woodfield, King's Valley, Purdum, and Lewisdale, although it is more developed today.

In spite of spiraling population growth and encroaching urban development, old-timers feel like Damascus retains its rural, small-town character. The Damascus Community Fair—a fully agricultural fair that has been in operation since 1940—attracts thousands of visitors annually in the first weekend of September.  4-H clubs are thriving, and in the past 10 years three new equestrian centers have opened within  of downtown Damascus.

November 17, 2009, marked the grand opening of the Damascus Heritage Society Museum.

Geography
As an unincorporated area, Damascus' boundaries are not officially defined. Damascus is recognized by the United States Census Bureau as a census-designated place, and by the United States Geological Survey as a populated place located at  (39.271040, −77.206098). Damascus proper is a locally high spot at 847 ft (258m) above sea level, while other portions of the area described as Damascus are as high as 866 ft (264m) above sea level.  However the highest elevation in the county is actually within what is considered Mt. Airy, MD, measuring 883 ft (269m) above sea level at the Full Gospel Church.  This peak just southwest of Mt. Airy  is actually the highest elevation in the immediately adjacent Washington D.C. suburbs.

Damascus is west of the fall line between the Piedmont of Appalachia and the Atlantic coastal plain. Damascus is known for its rural landscape and family-owned farms.

The town is located on Parr's Ridge, a low shale ridge that rises about 300 feet above the surrounding Piedmont.  Open hilltops in the area afford pisquerias vistas of the Appalachian Mountains to the southwest, west, and northwest.  These ridges include Sugarloaf Mountain and South Mountain, MD, Catoctin Mountain, in MD and PA, and the Blue Ridge of VA.  On very clear days, two 4,000 foot plus peaks in the Shenandoah National Park of VA can be seen 75 miles to the southwest.

Climate
The climate in this area is characterized by warm, humid summers and generally cool winters. According to the Köppen Climate Classification system, Damascus has a humid subtropical climate, abbreviated "Cfa" on climate maps.

Due to its higher elevation,rural landscape, and northernmost location in Montgomery County, its 32-inch average snowfall is the highest in the county and the immediately adjacent Washington D.C. suburbs.  In the record-breaking winter of 2009-2010, 98.4 inches of snow fell and a maximum depth of 37 inches was recorded, the greatest snow depth in the area's history.  Occasionally intense blizzards fed by coastal waters can paralyze the area.  In average winters, snow-covered ground comes and goes.  In severe winters, ponds may stay frozen and the ground will remain snow-covered for a month or two.

Rainfall is usually plentiful and well distributed throughout the year.  In an average year, about 46 inches is recorded. Thunderstorms are quite common during June to August.  Sometimes they produce hail and damaging winds, but tornadoes are rare.

Temperatures are moderate.  January's average monthly temperature is 31 °F, and July's is 74 °F.  Occasionally, frigid Arctic outbreaks from Canada can drive minimum temperatures below  for a morning or two.  During the summer months, heat waves can produce a week or two of 90 °F or higher afternoon days.  Summer morning temperatures are usually pleasant, averaging in the mid-60s.

Education and athletics
Damascus High School (DHS) is well-known regionally and nationally for its championship athletic teams, known as the Swarmin' Hornets.  
Damascus High School is one of the few remaining schools in the state to still hold its graduation ceremonies on the school's football field.  A rite of passage for many graduating seniors is to walk on the field and receive their diploma not only in front of family and friends in the stands but also the several hundred townspeople who gather outside the fences to watch the ceremony.  For the past few years the school has considered moving the ceremony to an alternate indoor location such as McDaniel College, but it has been voted down every year by the Senior class and their families. In the case of inclement weather, the graduation ceremony is held in the high school's auditorium.

Former U.S. Secretary of State and former Chairman of the Joint Chiefs of Staff General Colin Powell was the speaker for Damascus High School's Class of 2000 commencement ceremony at the high school's football stadium. Billy Ripken, brother of Oriole baseball player Cal Ripken Jr., was the speaker for the 2013 commencement, which also took place at the Damascus High School football stadium.

Civic groups
The American Legion is active in the community.  Since Damascus Post 171 was founded after World War II, it has engaged in charitable and civic endeavors, ranging from installing Christmas decorations downtown to sponsoring high school scholarships. Post 171 is host to annual ceremonies commemorating Memorial Day and Veterans Day on the grounds of the Post home.  Post 171 also sponsors an American Junior Legion baseball team, which is a perennial champion.

Montgomery County Fire & Rescue Company 13, with headquarters in Damascus, is one of the oldest companies in the Montgomery County fire service.  Originating in 1940 as an all-Volunteer force, the Damascus Volunteer Fire Department-Company 13  transitioned to a mix of full-time professionals and volunteers since the late 1980s.  Today the company is responsible for a fast growing residential and downtown area.

Demographics

As of the census of 2000, there were 11,430 people, 3,710 households, and 3,079 families residing in the area. The ethnic makeup of the area was 89.66% white, 6.63% African American, 0.24% Native American, 2.21% Asian, 0.03% Pacific Islander, 1.28% from other races, and 1.95% from two or more races. Hispanic or Latino of any race were 4.31% of the population.

There were 3,710 households, of which 52.7% had children under the age of 18 living with them, 68.0% were married couples living together, 11.3% had a female householder with no husband present, and 17.0% were non-families. 13.1% of all households were made up of individuals, and 3.3% had someone living alone who was 65 years of age or older. The average household size was 3.08 and the average family size was 3.38.

There are 34.0% of the population under the age of 18, 6.0% from 18 to 24, 33.6% from 25 to 44, 21.1% from 45 to 64, and 5.3% who were 65 years of age or older. The median age was 34 years. For every 100 females, there were 94.1 males. For every 100 females age 18 and over, there were 91.6 males.

The median income for a household in the community was $71,447, and the median income for a family was $76,462. Males had a median income of $51,590 versus $38,731 for females. The per capita income for the area was $26,659. About 4.2% of families and 5.3% of the population were below the poverty line, including 6.8% of those under age 18 and 0.9% of those age 65 or over.

References

External links

1819 establishments in Maryland
1890 establishments in Maryland
1914 disestablishments in Maryland
Census-designated places in Maryland
Census-designated places in Montgomery County, Maryland
Populated places disestablished in 1914
Populated places established in 1819
Populated places established in 1890